The Twin Pawns is a 1919 American silent film drama directed by Leonce Perret and starring Mae Murray. It is yet another film taken from Wilkie Collin's novel The Woman in White. The film was released by Pathé Exchange.

Cast
Mae Murray as Daisy, Violet White
Warner Oland as John Bent
Jack W. Johnston as Harry White (credited as J. W. Johnston)
Henry G. Sell as Bo Anderson
Edythe Chapman (uncredited)

Preservation status

Copies of The Twin Pawns are held at BFI National Film Institute and Filmmuseum Amsterdam.

See also
Leonce Perret filmography (director)
Leonce Perret filmography (actor)
The Woman in White (1912)
The Woman in White (1917)
Tangled Lives (1917)
The Woman in White (1921)
The Woman in White (1929)
The Woman in White (1948)

References

External links
 The Twin Pawns at IMDb.com

1919 films
American silent feature films
Films directed by Léonce Perret
American black-and-white films
Pathé Exchange films
1919 drama films
Silent American drama films
1910s American films
1910s English-language films